Arabia (fl. 565) was the only recorded daughter of Byzantine Emperor Justin II (r. 565–578) and Empress Sophia.

Name and meaning 
While mentioned in several primary sources, her name is only recorded in the Patria of Constantinople. The name is generally accepted as genuine, though Cyril Mango has raised some doubts in his works.

Shahîd's Byzantium and the Arabs in the sixth century (1995) examines the implications of her name. Arabia appears to be a unique personal name, and she seems to have been named by her great aunt, Empress Theodora, as a show of gratitude to Arab phylarch Arethas. The poem In laudem Justini minoris ("In praise of the younger Justin") by Flavius Cresconius Corippus, a primary source for the coronation of her father, notes its difference from the conventional and respectable name of her mother, indicating that it did sound strange even to a contemporary.

The name would appear to have negative connotations, as the Arab people were mostly seen as barbarians by the Byzantines. Similarly embarrassing names for the women of an imperial family had resulted in renamings both before and after Arabia's lifetime, for instance the empresses Aelia Eudocia and Aelia Anastasia, whose original names (Athenaïs and Ino) had pagan connotations. At the time however, the Byzantine Empire had a subject Arab population in the provinces of the Diocese of the East, a population that had undergone both Hellenization and Christianization. Thus "Arab" did not translate to "enemy" or "raider". For hostile peoples of Arab origin, the sources use the term "Saracens" instead.

Shahîd speculates that the name may have something to do with the period of Arabia's birth. Corippus informs us that Arabia was a married woman when her father rose to the throne in 565. Assuming her to be at least twenty years old, Shahîd suggests that the name could have been chosen to please her great-aunt Theodora (d. 548), the wife of Justinian I (r. 527–565). Theodora was noted for her support of Monophysitism, while her husband was known for actively persecuting this religious faction. One of Theodora's allies and strong supporter of Monophysitism happened to be the Arab phylarch Al-Harith ibn Jabalah (Arethas) of the Ghassanids. Arabia may have been named in honor of this alliance, especially given Justin's and Sophia's own adherence to Monophysitism at the time.

Family 
She married Baduarius, with whom she may have had a daughter, Firmina, attested in a single inscription dated to 564. The phrasing of the inscription is obscure, containing a Greek word that could be seen as "γενημένη" or "γενόμενη" of Arabia. "γενημένη" means "born of" and would make the phrase read "Firmina, daughter of Arabia", whilst "γενόμενη" means "who became". Cyril Mango reads the phrase as "Firmina who became the nursemaid of Arabia". 

Arabia is recorded by Corippus in his poem praying with her mother on 14 November 565: "At her holy side went her beautiful daughter, who could outdo the full moon with her own light, the equal of her mother in height, as shining in her appearance, as beautiful with her snowy cheeks. Her eyes blaze with fire, like her mother's". She was depicted in a statue at the Milion; another was possibly placed at the harbour of Sophianae.

Religious account 

A hagiography of Simeon Stylites the Younger claims that Arabia suffered from demonic possession during the reign of her father, and was cured by the saint.

References

Sources 
 
 
 

Justinian dynasty
6th-century Byzantine people
Daughters of Byzantine emperors
6th-century Byzantine women